The 2008 Tour de Georgia was a seven-stage professional bicycle race held from April 21 through April 27, 2008 across the state of Georgia.  The race was part of the 2008 USA Cycling Pro Tour and 2007–08 UCI America Tour, and was presented by AT&T.

Stage Results

Stage 1, April 21, Tybee Island – Savannah, 115.6 km

The first stage of the Tour was a short and flat stage suited for sprinters, starting in Tybee Island and finishing in Savannah. A group of six riders broke clear of the main field and established a lead of over one minute, before being caught in the final . The stage was won in a bunch sprint by Iván Domínguez of Toyota–United, ahead of Nicholas Sanderson (Jelly Belly) and Robert Förster (Gerolsteiner). Dominguez's win meant that he assumed the lead in the overall classification.

Stage 2, April 22, Statesboro – Augusta, 186.2 km

Stage 3, April 23, Washington – Gainesville, 176.5 km

Stage 4, April 24, Braselton (Road Atlanta), 16.1 km (Team Time Trial)

Stage 5, April 25, Suwanee – Dahlonega, 214.7 km

Stage 6, April 26, Blairsville – Brasstown Bald, 142.3 km

Stage 7, April 27, Atlanta, 100.9 km

Final standing

General classification

Young classification

Mountains classification

Sprint classification

Team classification

Jersey progress

Participating teams
UCI ProTour Teams
 AST –  Astana Team
 CSC –  Team CSC
 GST –  Gerolsteiner
 THR –  Team High Road

UCI Professional Continental Teams
 BMC –  BMC Racing Team
 TSL –  Slipstream–Chipotle presented by H30

UCI Continental Teams—America Tour
 BPC –  Bissell Pro Cycling Team
 HNM –  Health Net Pro Cycling Team Presented by Maxxis
 TUP –  Toyota–United Pro Cycling Team
 JBC –  Jelly Belly Cycling Team
 JIT –  Jittery Joe's Professional Cycling Team
 SYM –  Symmetrics Cycling Team
 TT1 –  Team Type 1
 RRC –  Rock Racing

UCI Continental Team—Asia Tour
 MPC –  GE/Marco Polo Cycling Team presented by Trek

References

External links
 

2008 in road cycling
2008 in American sports
Tour de Georgia